Sclerodistomoididae is a family of trematodes belonging to the order Plagiorchiida.

Genera:
 Sclerodistomoides Kamegai, 1971

References

Plagiorchiida